Mohammed Daoud (also Muḥammad Dāwūd) (1901-1984) was a Moroccan writer and historian. He was a major nationalist in northern Morocco during its struggle for independence from occupation by Spanish forces.

Life

Daoud tutored both the caliph, Muley Hassan ben el Mehdi and Ahmed Belbachir Haskouri in Tetouan's palace where they both grew up.

In 1923, Daoud became the head of a secondary school founded by El Haj Abdesselam Bennouna. He was also a prominent member of the Human Rights League in Tetouan and the Hispano-Muslim Association.

Along with Abdesalam Bennouna, Daoud formed the group al Muslihun (the Reformers) in 1926.

References

Mohamed Daoud Library Website

20th-century Moroccan historians
People from Tétouan
20th-century Moroccan writers
1984 deaths
1901 births